The sixth series of Warsaw Shore, a Polish television programme based in Warsaw, Poland was announced on 16 June 2016. The sixth season began airing on 28 August 2016. This was the first series not to include Anna Ryśnik since she made her exit during the previous series. Ewelina Kubiak and twin brothers Pauly and Pietro Kluk also left the show and was the first to feature new cast members Aleksandra Smoleń and Piotr Polak. Ahead of the series it was confirmed that the series would be filmed in Mielno. On 20 October 2016 it was announced that Klaudia Stec had quit the show mid-series and was replaced by new cast member Ewelina "Młoda" Bańkowska.

Cast
Aleksandra Smoleń
Damian Zduńczyk
Jakub Henke
Klaudia Stec (Episodes 1–6)
Magda Pyznar
Anna "Mała" Aleksandrzak
Ewelina "Młoda" Bańkowska (Episodes 9–12)
Piotr Polak
Wojciech Gola

Duration of cast

Notes 

 Key:  = "Cast member" is featured in this episode.
 Key:  = "Cast member" arrives in the house.
 Key:  = "Cast member" voluntarily leaves the house.
 Key:  = "Cast member" returns to the house.
 Key:  = "Cast member" leaves the series.
 Key:  = "Cast member" is not a cast member in this episode.

Episodes

References 

2016 Polish television seasons
Series 6